Novostroyka is a rural locality (a settlement) in Tsarevskoye Rural Settlement, Leninsky District, Volgograd Oblast, Russia. The population was 75 as of 2010. There are 2 streets.

Geography 
Novostroyka is located on the left bank of the Kalguta River, 16 km southeast of Leninsk (the district's administrative centre) by road. Malyayevka is the nearest rural locality.

References 

Rural localities in Leninsky District, Volgograd Oblast